Ṭam Dil is a reservoir lake situated 6 km from Saitual, the nearest town, and 64 km from Aizawl, the capital city of Mizoram, India.

Name 
In Mizo language, the word Ṭam is a contraction of anṭam, which means a mustard plant; and Dil means "lake".

Fauna 
A new species of frog called Leptolalax tamdil was described from this lake in 2010.

Legends 

The origin and etymology of Ṭam Dil are shrouded in myth. Folklore has it that a married couple had a jhum plot in this small valley surrounded by small steep hills. The man unfortunately died leaving the wife to care for the crops alone. In the middle of the field  was a robust mustard plant, conspicuously bigger than any other plants. One night the widow has a visitation by her husband, who informed her to take special care of the giant mustard plant as it was a harbinger of immense blessing. On the wake, she did as told, and the plant thrived very well. As time went, the widow remarried but the new husband objected to any thing reminiscence of the deceased husband, and so he plucked the plant up by the roots and discarded it. The vast hole left in the ground was then soon filled by water (seeping from the plant, according to some versions; from the ground itself, in another version) to become an exquisite lake. Hence the name of Ṭam Dil, for the "lake of the mustard".

Tourism

The lake is reconstructed as part of building a fishing reservoir by the Fisheries Department, Government of Mizoram. Lake-side resorts are maintained by the Tourism Department.

See also
Tourism in Mizoram

References

External links
 Tam Dil 

Tourist attractions in Mizoram
Landforms of Mizoram
Reservoirs in India